Peder Ludvig Møller (18 April 1814 in Aalborg, Denmark – 8 December in Sotteville-Lès-Rouen, France,<> 1865) was a Danish literary critic.  On 22 December 1845, Møller published an article critiquing Stages on Life's Way, a philosophical work by Søren Kierkegaard.

External links
 Peder Ludvig Møller biography
 Review of Seducer by Henrik Stangerup 1985

1814 births
1865 deaths
Danish literary critics